There were 7 equestrian events at the 2010 South American Games. The events were held over March 21–24.

Medal summary

Medal table

Medalists

Equestrian
South American Games
South American Games
2010
2010 South American Games